Letharia is a genus of fruticose lichens belonging to the family Parmeliaceae.

There were historically two species of Letharia: L. vulpina and L. columbiana. Recent molecular sequence studies published in 2016 confirm at least 6 species in Western North America alone, with more expected to be confirmed using similar methods in other parts of the world.

The typical photobiont is a green alga of genus Trebouxia.

References

Parmeliaceae
Lecanorales genera
Lichen genera
Taxa named by Theodor Magnus Fries
Taxa described in 1871